Jürg Zimmermann (born January 1, 1943) is a retired Swiss professional ice hockey player who represented the Swiss national team at the 1964 Winter Olympics.

References

External links
Jürg Zimmermann's stats at Sports-Reference.com

Living people
1943 births
Ice hockey people from Bern
EHC Biel players
Ice hockey players at the 1964 Winter Olympics
Olympic ice hockey players of Switzerland